The 2015 Anambra State House of Assembly election was held on April 11, 2015, to elect members of the Anambra State House of Assembly in Nigeria. All the 30 seats were up for election in the Anambra State House of Assembly.

Rita Mmaduagwu from APGA representing Nnewi South II constituency was elected Speaker, while Hartford Oseke from APGA representing Awka South II constituency was elected Deputy Speaker.

Results 
The result of the election is listed below.

 Ume Ikechukwu John from APGA won Aguata I constituency
 Uzoezie Ikemefuna Ralph-Collins from APGA won Aguata II constituency
 Uche Victor Okafor from APGA won Ayamelum constituency
 Emenaka Obinna Christopher from APGA won Anambra East constituency
 Victor Jideofor Okoye from APGA won Anambra West constituency
 Francis Okoye from PDP won Anaocha I constituency
 Charles Chukwuma Ezeani from PDP won Anaocha II constituency
 Boniface Okonkwo from APGA won Awka North constituency
 Godwin Okafor from APGA won Awka South I constituency
 Harford Oseke from APGA won Awka South II constituency
 Lawrence Chukwunweike Ezeudu from APGA won Dunukofia constituency
 Augustine Onyebuchi Offor from PDP won Ekwusigo constituency
 Benson Chuk Nwawulu from APGA won Ogbaru I constituency
 Udeze Somtochukwu Nkem from APGA won Ogbaru II constituency
 Chugbo Enwezor from APGA won Onitsha North I constituency
 Ibuzo Edward Obi from APGA won Onitsha North II constituency
 Patrick Obiora Aniunoh from APGA won Onitsha South I constituency
 Mmegbuanaeze Tochukwu Francis from APGA won Idemili North constituency
 Ezenwune Fabian Chukwuka from APGA won Idemili South constituency
 Nkeiru Nikky Ebere Ugochukwu from APGA won Orumba South constituency
 Vivian Akpamgbo Okadigbo from APGA won Oyi constituency
 Udemadu Chidi from APGA won Ihiala I constituency
 Agbodike Paschal from APGA won Ihiala II constituency
 Timothy Ifedioranma from APGA won Njikoka I constituency
 Peter Chima Ndubuisi Ibida from APGA won Njikoka II constituency
 Anazodo Amalachukwu Kenneth from APGA won Nnewi North constituency
 Iruba Kingsley Chukwuma from APGA won Nnewi South I constituency
 Rita Mmaduagwu from APGA won Nnewi South II constituency
 Beverly Ifeanyi Nkemdiche from APGA won Onitsha South II constituency
 Romanus Ugochukwu Obi from APGA won Orumba North constituency

References 

Anambra